The 2014–15 UEFA Europa League qualifying phase and play-off round were played from 1 July to 28 August 2014. A total of 170 teams competed in the qualifying phase and play-off round to decide 31 of the 48 places in the group stage of the 2014–15 UEFA Europa League.

All times were CEST (UTC+2).

Round and draw dates
All draws were held at UEFA headquarters in Nyon, Switzerland.

Matches may also be played on Tuesdays or Wednesdays instead of the regular Thursdays due to scheduling conflicts.

Format
In the qualifying phase and play-off round, each tie was played over two legs, with each team playing one leg at home. The team that scored more goals on aggregate over the two legs advanced to the next round. If the aggregate score was level, the away goals rule was applied, i.e. the team that scored more goals away from home over the two legs advanced. If away goals were also equal, then 30 minutes of extra time was played. The away goals rule was again applied after extra time, i.e. if there were goals scored during extra time and the aggregate score was still level, the visiting team advanced by virtue of more away goals scored. If no goals were scored during extra time, the tie was decided by penalty shoot-out.

In the draws for each round, teams were seeded based on their UEFA club coefficients at the beginning of the season, with the teams divided into seeded and unseeded pots. A seeded team was drawn against an unseeded team, with the order of legs in each tie decided randomly. Due to the limited time between matches, the draws for the second and third qualifying rounds took place before the results of the previous round were known. For these draws (or in any cases where the result of a tie in the previous round was not known at the time of the draw), the seeding was carried out under the assumption that the team with the higher coefficient of an undecided tie advanced to this round, which means if the team with the lower coefficient was to advance, it simply took the seeding of its defeated opponent. Prior to the draws, UEFA may form "groups" in accordance with the principles set by the Club Competitions Committee, but they were purely for convenience of the draw and for ensuring that teams from the same association were not drawn against each other, and did not resemble any real groupings in the sense of the competition.

Teams
A total of 170 teams were involved in the qualifying phase and play-off round (including 15 losers of the Champions League third qualifying round which entered the play-off round). The 31 winners of the play-off round advanced to the group stage to join the 7 automatic qualifiers and 10 losers of the Champions League play-off round.

Below were the participating teams (with their 2014 UEFA club coefficients), grouped by their starting rounds.

Notes

First qualifying round

Seeding
A total of 78 teams played in the first qualifying round. The draw was held on 23 June 2014. (Note: The numbers for each team were pre-assigned by UEFA so that the draw could be held in one run for all groups with ten teams and another run for all groups with twelve teams.)

Summary
The first legs were played on 1 and 3 July, and the second legs were played on 8, 10 and 11 July 2014.

|}

Notes

Matches

Ferencváros won 3–2 on aggregate.

Dundalk won 5–1 on aggregate.

Zimbru Chișinău won 3–2 on aggregate.

Shakhter Karagandy won 6–1 on aggregate.

Kairat won 1–0 on aggregate.

Astana won 6–1 on aggregate.

Litex Lovech won 3–0 on aggregate.

Široki Brijeg won 5–0 on aggregate.

Tromsø won 13–1 on aggregate.

Sligo Rovers won 4–0 on aggregate.

Koper won 9–0 on aggregate.

MYPA won 1–0 on aggregate.

4–4 on aggregate. Sillamäe Kalev won on away goals.

Chikhura Sachkhere won 4–1 on aggregate.

Metalurg Skopje won 5–0 on aggregate.

Brommapojkarna won 3–2 on aggregate.

Botev Plovdiv won 6–0 on aggregate.

4–4 on aggregate. Flamurtari Vlorë won on away goals.

Inter Baku won 6–3 on aggregate.

Vaduz won 4–0 on aggregate.

Rosenborg won 6–0 on aggregate.

IFK Göteborg won 2–0 on aggregate.

Atlantas won 3–2 on aggregate.

Haugesund won 3–2 on aggregate.

Spartak Trnava won 9–2 on aggregate.

Čukarički won 4–0 on aggregate.

RNK Split won 3–1 on aggregate.

2–2 on aggregate. Laçi won 3–2 on penalties.

Linfield won 3–2 on aggregate.

Víkingur Gøta won 3–2 on aggregate.

Diósgyőr won 6–2 on aggregate.

Budućnost Podgorica won 5–1 on aggregate.

Derry City won 9–0 on aggregate.

Aberdeen won 8–0 on aggregate.

Crusaders won 5–2 on aggregate.

Željezničar won 1–0 on aggregate.

Nõmme Kalju won 3–2 on aggregate.

Stjarnan won 8–0 on aggregate.

FH won 6–2 on aggregate.

Notes

Second qualifying round

Seeding
A total of 80 teams played in the second qualifying round: 41 teams which entered in this round, and the 39 winners of the first qualifying round. The draw was held on 23 June 2014. (Note: The numbers for each team were pre-assigned by UEFA so that the draw could be held in one run for all groups.)

Notes

Summary
The first legs were played on 17 July, and the second legs were played on 22 and 24 July 2014.

|}

Notes

Matches

Astana won 3–1 on aggregate.

Esbjerg won 2–1 on aggregate.

Slovan Liberec won 4–0 on aggregate.

Neftchi Baku won 3–2 on aggregate.

Zorya Luhansk won 5–1 on aggregate.

Dinamo Minsk won 3–0 on aggregate.

Omonia won 2–0 on aggregate.

Trenčín won 4–3 on aggregate.

Lech Poznań won 3–1 on aggregate.

Spartak Trnava won 3–0 on aggregate.

Shakhter Karagandy won 3–0 on aggregate.

Ruch Chorzów won 3–2 on aggregate.

Asteras Tripoli won 5–3 on aggregate.

1–1 on aggregate. Elfsborg won 4–3 on penalties.

Petrolul Ploiești won 5–1 on aggregate.

St. Pölten won 3–2 on aggregate.

FH won 3–1 on aggregate.

Brommapojkarna won 5–1 on aggregate.

Mladá Boleslav won 6–1 on aggregate.

Rosenborg won 4–3 on aggregate.

CFR Cluj won 1–0 on aggregate.

2–2 on aggregate. St Johnstone won 5–4 on penalties.

1–1 on aggregate. Zimbru Chișinău won on away goals.

Diósgyőr won 3–2 on aggregate.

IFK Göteborg won 3–1 on aggregate.

Víkingur Gøta won 2–1 on aggregate.

Zulte Waregem won 5–2 on aggregate.

Molde won 5–2 on aggregate.

2–2 on aggregate. Metalurg Skopje won on away goals.

RNK Split won 2–1 on aggregate.

0–0 on aggregate. Chikhura Sachkhere won 4–1 on penalties.

Rijeka won 3–1 on aggregate.

Krasnodar won 9–0 on aggregate.

Stjarnan won 5–4 on aggregate.

Aberdeen won 2–1 on aggregate.

AIK won 2–1 on aggregate.

Shakhtyor Soligorsk won 6–1 on aggregate.

Hajduk Split won 3–2 on aggregate.

Sarajevo won 3–2 on aggregate.

Grödig won 5–2 on aggregate.

Notes

Third qualifying round

Seeding
A total of 58 teams played in the third qualifying round: 18 teams which entered in this round, and the 40 winners of the second qualifying round. The draw was held on 18 July 2014. (Note: The numbers for each team were pre-assigned by UEFA so that the draw could be held in one run for all groups with twelve teams and another run for all groups with ten teams.)

Notes

Summary
The first legs were played on 31 July, and the second legs were played on 7 August 2014.

|}

Notes

Matches

Hajduk Split won 5–4 on aggregate.

Astana won 4–1 on aggregate.

Neftchi Baku won 3–2 on aggregate.

Omonia won 4–0 on aggregate.

Astra Giurgiu won 6–2 on aggregate.

2–2 on aggregate. Ruch Chorzów won on away goals.

Dynamo Moscow won 3–2 on aggregate.

Elfsborg won 5–3 on aggregate.

1–1 on aggregate. Karabükspor won on away goals.

Lyon won 6–2 on aggregate.

Hull City won 2–1 on aggregate.

Torino won 7–0 on aggregate.

PSV Eindhoven won 4–2 on aggregate.

Dinamo Minsk won 3–0 on aggregate.

Rio Ave won 1–0 on aggregate.

Zorya Luhansk won 3–2 on aggregate.

Young Boys won 3–0 on aggregate.

RNK Split won 2–0 on aggregate.

Shakhtyor Soligorsk won 7–4 on aggregate.

Petrolul Ploiești won 5–2 on aggregate.

Rijeka won 9–1 on aggregate.

Asteras Tripoli won 3–2 on aggregate.

Krasnodar won 8–1 on aggregate.

Stjarnan won 1–0 on aggregate.

Sarajevo won 4–3 on aggregate.

Real Sociedad won 5–2 on aggregate.

Club Brugge won 5–0 on aggregate.

Spartak Trnava won 3–2 on aggregate.

2–2 on aggregate. Zimbru Chișinău won on away goals.

Notes

Play-off round

Seeding
A total of 62 teams played in the play-off round: 18 teams which entered in this round, the 29 winners of the third qualifying round, and the 15 losers of the Champions League third qualifying round. The draw was held on 8 August 2014. (Note: The numbers for each team were pre-assigned by UEFA so that the draw could be held in one run for all groups with ten teams and another run for all groups with twelve teams.)

Notes

Summary
The first legs were played on 20 and 21 August, and the second legs were played on 28 August 2014.

|}

Notes

Matches

Dnipro Dnipropetrovsk won 2–1 on aggregate.

Internazionale won 9–0 on aggregate.

Villarreal won 7–0 on aggregate.

Legia Warsaw won 3–0 on aggregate.

Dynamo Moscow won 4–3 on aggregate.

Tottenham Hotspur won 5–1 on aggregate.

1–1 on aggregate. Qarabağ won on away goals.

HJK won 5–4 on aggregate.

Metalist Kharkiv won 1–0 on aggregate.

PSV Eindhoven won 3–0 on aggregate.

Dinamo Minsk won 5–2 on aggregate.

2–2 on aggregate. Rio Ave won on away goals.

1–1 on aggregate. Saint-Étienne won 4–3 on penalties.

Dinamo Zagreb won 5–2 on aggregate.

Apollon Limassol won 5–2 on aggregate.

Young Boys won 3–1 on aggregate.

Feyenoord won 5–4 on aggregate.

Sparta Prague won 4–2 on aggregate.

Trabzonspor won 2–0 on aggregate.

Panathinaikos won 6–2 on aggregate.

PAOK won 4–1 on aggregate.

Zürich won 4–2 on aggregate.

3–3 on aggregate. Asteras Tripoli won on away goals.

Partizan won 5–3 on aggregate.

Club Brugge won 3–1 on aggregate.

Torino won 1–0 on aggregate.

2–2 on aggregate. Astra Giurgiu won on away goals.

2–2 on aggregate. Lokeren won on away goals.

Krasnodar won 3–1 on aggregate.

Borussia Mönchengladbach won 10–2 on aggregate.

Rijeka won 4–0 on aggregate.

Notes

Statistics
There were 737 goals in 278 matches in the qualifying phase and play-off round, for an average of 2.65 goals per match.

Top goalscorers

Top assists

References

External links
2014–15 UEFA Europa League

1
UEFA Europa League qualifying rounds